The 2012 Ehime FC season sees Ehime FC compete in J.League Division 2 for the seventh consecutive season. Ehime FC are also competing in the 2012 Emperor's Cup.

Players

Competitions

J. League

League table

Matches

Emperor's Cup

References

Ehime FC
Ehime FC seasons